Frigidibacter is a Gram-negative and strictly aerobic genus of bacteria from the family of Rhodobacteraceae with one known species (Frigidibacter albus). Frigidibacter albus has been isolated from water from a lake from Xinjiang in China.

References

Rhodobacteraceae
Bacteria genera
Monotypic bacteria genera